Gair Kaanooni is a 1989 Indian Hindi-language action film directed and written by Prayag Raj. The film stars Sridevi and Govinda. Kimi Katkar, Shashi Kapoor, Ranjeet and Kader Khan are featured in supporting role. Rajinikanth features in a special appearance.

The film was a hit at the box office It was later dubbed in Tamil as Rakkamma Kaiyathattu.

Plot
Officer Kapil Khanna was a strict enforcer of the law. In order to gain evidence against the local mafia don D'Costa he sought a favour from his underworld friend Azam Khan, a man with a golden heart. Azam Khan was successful in securing evidence against D'Costa but the mafia got wise to it and before Azam Khan could reach the law, D'Costa with the help of his friend Dalpat Dalal liquidated him. The blame of Azam Khan's death was owned by a petty driver Nathulal for a price paid by Dalpat Dalal. Azam Khan's little son Akbar swore vengeance against Police Officer Kapil Khanna as he felt him responsible. Kapil Khanna's wife delivered a baby boy in the hospital of D'Costa, so did Dalpat Dalaal's wife to a baby girl. D'Costa returned Dalpat's favour by interchanging the two on Dalpat's insistence. Kapil Khanna was enraged at this and he took to a legal battle against the hospital authorities.

Cast
 Sridevi as Laxmi
 Govinda as Om Narayan
 Shashi Kapoor as Police Commissioner Kapil khanna Special Appearance 
 Rajinikanth as Azam Khan / Akbar Khan (Double Role) Special Appearance
 Kimi Katkar as Rita D'Costa
 Ranjeet as Robert D'Costa
 Kader Khan as Dalpat Dalaal
 Tej Sapru as Tony D'Costa
 Aruna Irani as Bantho
 Satyen Kappu as Nathulal
 Mukri as Chinnappa Malappa Shetty
 Viju Khote as Police Inspector
 Pinchoo Kapoor as Judge
 Rohini Hattangadi as Kapil Khanna's wife.

Soundtrack
Lyrics: Indeevar

References

External links

1989 films
Films scored by Bappi Lahiri
Indian action drama films
1980s action drama films
1980s Hindi-language films
1989 drama films